Emanuel Luís Marques Walter de Magalhães (born 28 May 1980), commonly known as Bibi, is a Portuguese former futsal player who played as a defender. Bibi won two Portuguese futsal leagues with Sporting CP and played for the Portugal national team in the 2008 World Cup.

References

External links

1980 births
Living people
Portuguese men's futsal players
Sporting CP futsal players
Portuguese expatriate sportspeople in Spain
Portuguese expatriates in Italy
Portuguese expatriates in Saudi Arabia